Ian Park is a former association football player who represented New Zealand.

Park made his full All Whites debut as a substitute in a 0–0 draw with Iran on 18 August 1973. He ended his international playing career with 20 A-international caps to his credit, his final cap in a 6–1 win over Solomon Islands on 29 February 1980.

References

Year of birth missing (living people)
Living people
New Zealand association footballers
New Zealand international footballers
Association footballers not categorized by position